Jacob Lake Lookout Tower is located in the North Kaibab Ranger District 30 miles southeast of Fredonia, AZ. Built in 1934 by the Civilian Conservation Corps (CCC), it is an 80’ Aermotor steel tower with a 7’ x 7’ metal cab and is listed on the National Register of Historic Places. Visitors can read about the lookout process and can still climb the tower to view the area and see the Osborne Fire Finder.

References

External links
 

National Register of Historic Places in Coconino County, Arizona
Fire lookout towers on the National Register of Historic Places in Arizona
Government buildings completed in 1934
Towers completed in 1934
Buildings and structures in Coconino County, Arizona
Kaibab National Forest
1934 establishments in Arizona